La Gran Cruzada (2012) (Spanish for "The Great Crusade") was an annual professional wrestling major event produced by Mexican professional wrestling promotion International Wrestling Revolution Group (IWRG), which took place on August 5, 2012 in Arena Naucalpan, Naucalpan, State of Mexico, Mexico. The main event of the show was the eponymous Gran Cruzada tournament, a 30-man Battle Royal with the winner being named the number one contender for the IWRG Rey del Ring Championship and would receive a match against Rey del Ring Champion Oficial Factor at a later date. The Gran Cruzada was won by Hijo de Pirata Morgan, lastly eliminating El Hijo de L.A. Park to win it. The victory played off the fact that Hijo de Pirata Morgan was the last man eliminated in the 2012 Rey del Ring tournament by Oficial Factor and had been developing a slowly escalating storyline between the two.

Production

Background
In 2011 the  Mexican wrestling promotion  International Wrestling Revolution Group (IWRG; Sometimes referred to as Grupo Internacional Revolución in Spanish) started to award a championship belt to the winner of their annual Rey del Ring ("King of the Ring") tournament that could be defended between the annual tournaments. As a result, IWRG also added an annual La Gran Cruzada ("The Great Crusade") tournament about halfway between the Rey del Ring tournaments. Like the Rey del Ring the eponymous Gran Cruzada match is a 30-man elimination match similar in concept to the WWE's annual Royal Rumble match. The winner of the Gran Cruzada tournament would become the number one contender for the Rey del Ring Championship with a title match at a later date. The La Gran Cruzada shows, as well as the majority of the IWRG shows in general, are held in "Arena Naucalpan", owned by the promoters of IWRG and their main arena. The 2012 La Gran Cruzada show was the second time that IWRG promoted a show under that name.

Storylines
The event featured four professional wrestling matches with different wrestlers involved in pre-existing scripted feuds, plots and storylines. Wrestlers were portrayed as either heels (referred to as rudos in Mexico, those that portray the "bad guys") or faces (técnicos in Mexico, the "good guy" characters) as they followed a series of tension-building events, which culminated in a wrestling match or series of matches.

Results

Battle Royal elimination order

Aftermath
Hijo de Pirata Morgan received his match for the IWRG Rey del Ring Championship on August 12, 2012 at IWRG's Caravan de Campeones event where he defeated Oficial Factor to become the new Rey del Ring Champion. He would hold the championship for just over a month, until Oficial Factor regained the title, as well as won Hijo de Pirata Morgan's IWRG Junior de Juniors Championship on September 23, 2012.

References

External links 
IWRG official website

2012 in professional wrestling
2012 in Mexico
2012
August 2012 events in Mexico